The 1917 Auckland Rugby League season was its 9th. Due to the large number of players now serving in the First World War it was agreed to relax transfer rules to allow players from stronger teams to join weaker teams to even the competition. It was noted how many men from various clubs had been killed in battle by the beginning of 1917. They were Cecil Walker, Doug Dawson, T Marshall (Grafton Athletic), Charles Savory, Frank McWhirter (Ponsonby United), Graham Cook (Ponsonby United), N Vause, V McCollum, Alf Gault, T Lambert, E Tiernan, F Stubbs, W. G. Handle (Ponsonby United), B Hart, F Gladding, A Powley, Chas Mann (North Shore Albions), William Moeki, G Jones, W Harris, S Magee, S Greer (City Rovers), Alan Miller, Charles Sinton, and Leslie O'Leary (Sunnyside). City Rovers had 'sent' ninety men to war by this time and twenty-one had been wounded and five killed. The Sunnyside club had only nine members left and one of those who had gone to the war (William O'Shaughnessey) said that in the trenches he had made a list of league players from various clubs which totalled 120. All three of the Sunnyside secretaries had enlisted and the executive was also gone. Ponsonby had also had over eighty of its members join the war effort.

    
    
    
    

Thirty three teams entered the six grades. This was down on previous seasons due to the number of men who had gone to fight. In the senior grade there were still six teams entered, with five second grade teams, five third grade teams, nine fourth grade teams, six fifth grade teams, and four sixth grade teams. The season was notable for the fact that Otahuhu was forced to drop out of the first grade competition after round 4 as it struggled to field senior players. Grafton Athletic also fell by the way-side soon after for the same reason.

Ponsonby United won the first grade championship for the first time in their history. They also won the Roope Rooster trophy for the first time with a 12–6 win over City Rovers in the final. By winning both competitions they became the second Auckland senior club to win multiple trophies in the same season following on the footsteps of City Rovers who had won both titles the year prior.

News

Representative season 
At the season end rather than a strong representative program which had been a feature of earlier years several charity and exhibition matches were played instead. These included a match versus the victorious Auckland Rugby Union club champions Railway. The team in its entirety switched to the rugby league code. They played matches with Ponsonby United and City Rovers at the end of the season. The team would go on to struggle for numbers itself in 1918 before eventually amalgamating with Grafton Athletic.

Victoria Park 
In 1916 the fence around Victoria Park had been removed by the council which made it very difficult to collect gate revenue. The league had however secured land which would be developed as Carlaw Park with the aim being to secure the ground and gain revenue from ticket sales in the future.

First grade championship
The 1st grade championship had been competing for the Myers Cup from 1910 to 1914 but after the beginning of the war the league decided to not award trophies though the grade competitions were still competed for as normal. Twenty three first grade season matches were played which was less than previous seasons but owing to the fact that both Otahuhu and Grafton Athletic were forced to drop out of the competition due to a lack of players as a result of so many leaving to join the war effort. After their Round 4 default to North Shore where only two Otahuhu players turned up they decided to amalgamate senior teams with Grafton. This was short lived however as Grafton themselves only lasted until Round 7 when they themselves defaulted a week later. Ponsonby United were crowned champions for the first time in their existence.

1st Grade standings

1st Grade results

Round 1

Round 2

Round 3

Round 4

Round 5

Round 6

Round 7 
Grafton continued to struggle to put out a competitive team and played 3 men short against Newton.

Round 8 
The unknown try for Ponsonby in their win over North Shore was described in the New Zealand Herald match report as “a fierce combined rally resulted in the pack taking the ball over for a try”. Grafton defaulted their match with City and this ended their season as they were unable to field a side for any further competitive matches.

Round 9

Round 10 

On 21 July Ponsonby played a match versus the Waterside Workers after both Otahuhu and Grafton had left the competition. Ponsonby won the match by 14 points to 3.

Roope Rooster knockout competition
After both Otahuhu and Grafton Athletic had dropped out of the senior grade there were only 4 senior teams left. However the Waterside Workers formed a team and played a match versus Ponsonby during the season, and they also played in the first round of the Roope Rooster.

Following the conclusion of the Roope Rooster competition on 25 August a benefit match was played between City Rovers and Newton Rangers at Victoria Park. It was won by City 31 points to 11. On 1 September City defeated Ponsonby in another exhibition match, described as “one of the fastest and most exciting matches this season” by 13 points to 12 at Victoria Park.

Round 1

Semi final

Final

Top try scorers and point scorers
The following point scoring lists include both Senior Championship matches and the Roope Rooster competition.

Senior exhibition and charity matches

Challenge Match

Mackrell Memorial
On 8 September a combined match was played between Ponsonby-Shore and Newton-City with the proceeds devoted to a memorial to the late William Mackrell. This was a premonition of the future with City and Newton several decades later actually combining clubs.

Gala match in the Auckland Domain
On 15 September a gala day was held with Rugby League and Football (“Association”) played to raise money for the RSA. It was declared a success and 200 pounds was raised. The match was played between Ponsonby United who had won the league championship and a combined team from the remainder of the clubs in the senior grade (City Rovers, Newton Rangers, and North Shore Albions). The combined team won by 26 to 21. The day also featured a sprint race between 6 players from the senior teams. It was won by Nicholson of the North Shore Albions. A ‘house match’ was also played between Hobson Hotel and Thompson and Hill's which Hobson Hotel won by 23 points to 3.

Exhibition matches
City and Ponsonby United played an exhibition match on 24 September at Victoria Park. On 29 September a very controversial cross code match was played between Railway (a combination of Marist Brothers Old Boys and City) who were the winners of the Auckland Rugby Union competition, and Ponsonby, the Auckland Rugby League club champions. The match was not sanctioned by the Auckland Rugby Union as Railway was also scheduled to play an annual charity rugby union match versus University on the same day. The Railway team playing the league code had “gone over to the Northern Union game”. They played a further match against City Rovers which they lost by 18 points to 6 before moving to the Auckland Rugby League full-time in 1918. They would eventually amalgamate with Grafton Athletic and in 1919 they would reform as the Marist Rugby League Old Boys club”.

Lower grade competitions
The newly formed Pupuke club entered a side in the third grade. They were based in the Takapuna area and wore red uniforms. Manukau, Remuera and Riverhead did not field teams in any grades in 1917. It was decided at the start of the season that no trophies would be awarded in any of the grades due to the effect of the war on the competition and in line with there being no representative football being played in the war years. On several occasions it was asked if they would reconsider awarding winning teams anything but they consistently stated that nothing would be awarded, including badges.

There were also house matches played. On August 4 Thompson and Hill defeated A. & T. Burt 7-2.

Second grade
Ponsonby won the grade. Otahuhu withdrew after 1 round following a 12-0 loss to Newton. Only 18 results were reported from 25 scheduled matches.
{|
|-
|

Third grade
Newton withdrew from the competition after 1 round, while Ponsonby withdrew after 3 rounds. City Rovers beat Northcote & Birkenhead Ramblers in round 11, 5-3 to seal the championship. Of the 21 matches played only 12 scores were reported.
{|
|-
|

Fourth grade
City won the fourth grade competition after going undefeated. Otahuhu (the runner up did manage a 3-3 draw with them however. City won the majority of their matches without conceding any points (19-0, 26-0, 42-0, 68-0, 35-0, 3-3, 13-5, 33-0, 10-0, 25-0, 8-0, and 33-0). North Shore withdrew after failing to field a side in round 1. Ponsonby withdrew after defaulting in round 10. There were only 26 scores reported, with 26 scores not reported.
{|
|-
|

Fifth grade
North Shore Albions won the championship. Only 12 match results were reported with 21 results not reported. Otahuhu only had 4 of their results reported but were said to have finished runner up, not 3rd.
{|
|-
|

Sixth grade
North Shore won the championship. There were 16 results reported and 5 were not reported.
{|
|-
|

Representative fixture
Auckland played a match against a Military Representative side representing the Trentham, Featherston, and Tauherenikau camps at the Auckland Domain on 13 October. A large crowd attended and the total proceeds of the game were devoted to the Red Cross.

Auckland v Military Representatives

Auckland matches played and scorers

References

External links
 Auckland Rugby League Official Site

Auckland Rugby League seasons
Auckland Rugby League